This is a list of presidential trips made by Barack Obama during 2011, the third year of his presidency as the 44th president of the United States.

This list excludes trips made within Washington, D.C., the U.S. federal capital in which the White House, the official residence and principal workplace of the president, is located. Additionally excluded are trips to Camp David, the country residence of the president, and to the private home of the Obama family in Kenwood, Chicago, Illinois.

January

February

March

April

May

June

August

September

November

References

2011 in the United States
Presidential travels of Barack Obama
Lists of events in the United States
2011-related lists
2011 in international relations